Cottonwood Falls is the largest city and county seat of Chase County, Kansas, United States.  As of the 2020 census, the population of the city was 851.  It is located south of Strong City along the south side of the Cottonwood River.

History

Early history

For many millennia, the Great Plains of North America was inhabited by nomadic Native Americans.  From the 16th century to 18th century, the Kingdom of France claimed ownership of large parts of North America.  In 1762, after the French and Indian War, France secretly ceded New France to Spain, per the Treaty of Fontainebleau.

19th century

In 1802, Spain returned most of the land to France.  In 1803, most of the land for modern day Kansas was acquired by the United States from France as part of the 828,000 square mile Louisiana Purchase for 2.83 cents per acre.

In 1854, the Kansas Territory was organized, then in 1861 Kansas became the 34th U.S. state.  In 1859, Chase County was established within the Kansas Territory, which included the land for modern day Cottonwood Falls.

The first settlement in the area of Cottonwood Falls was in 1854, when an Indian trader named Seth Hayes founded a cattle ranch on the Cottonwood River close to the mouth of Diamond Spring Creek. The area around the town was organized as Chase County in 1859, and Cottonwood Falls was designated the temporary county seat.  Other early settlers arrived in Cottonwood and surrounding lands in 1856 to 1858.

The first post office in Cottonwood Falls was established in 1858.  In 1873 the city's French Renaissance style Chase County courthouse was built; at roughly the same time, the Atchison, Topeka and Santa Fe Railway reached Cottonwood Falls area. Through the late 19th and early 20th centuries the area around the city was mainly divided into farms and cattle ranches.

20th century
In 1931, a Transcontinental & Western Air flight crashed ten miles south of Cottonwood Falls near the community of Bazaar, killing all eight on board, including University of Notre Dame football coach Knute Rockne. A monument to the crash is located on private property.

There have been numerous floods during the history of Cottonwood Falls.  In June and July 1951, due to heavy rains, rivers and streams flooded numerous cities in Kansas, including Cottonwood Falls.  Many reservoirs and levees were built in Kansas as part of a response to the Great Flood of 1951.

Geography

Cottonwood Falls is located at  (38.368159, -96.542918), in the scenic Flint Hills of the Great Plains.

Climate
The climate in this area is characterized by hot, humid summers and generally mild to cool winters.  According to the Köppen Climate Classification system, Cottonwood Falls has a humid subtropical climate, abbreviated "Cfa" on climate maps.

Area events
 Prairie Fire Festival

Area attractions
Cottonwood Falls has five listings on the National Register of Historic Places (NRHP).
 Cartter Building (NRHP).
 Chase County Courthouse (NRHP). It is the oldest courthouse in continual use in the state of Kansas and one of the oldest in continual use West of the Mississippi.
 Chase County National Bank (NRHP).
 Cottonwood River Bridge (NRHP).
 Samuel N Wood House (NRHP).
 Kansas Historical Marker - A Landmark Of Distinction, located in courthouse square.
 Chase Lake Falls

Demographics

Cottonwood Falls is part of the Emporia Micropolitan Statistical Area.

2010 census
As of the census of 2010, there were 903 people, 342 households, and 205 families residing in the city. The racial makeup of the city was 93.9% White, 3.4% African American, 0.2% Asian, 1.1% from other races, and 1.3% from two or more races. Hispanic or Latino of any race were 7.0% of the population.

There were 342 households, of which 28.7% had children under the age of 18 living with them, 46.8% were married couples living together, 9.4% had a female householder with no husband present, 3.8% had a male householder with no wife present, and 40.1% were non-families. 37.1% of all households were made up of individuals, and 21.7% had someone living alone who was 65 years of age or older. The average household size was 2.22 and the average family size was 2.92.

The median age in the city was 43.3 years. 20.2% of residents were under the age of 18; 8.7% were between the ages of 18 and 24; 24.9% were from 25 to 44; 23.1% were from 45 to 64; and 23.3% were 65 years of age or older. The gender makeup of the city was 49.8% male and 50.2% female.

2000 census
As of the census of 2000, there were 966 people, 375 households, and 227 families residing in the city. The racial makeup of the city was 94.93% White, 2.38% African American, 1.14% Native American, 0.21% Asian, 0.83% from other races, and 0.52% from two or more races. Hispanic or Latino of any race were 2.38% of the population.

There were 375 households, out of which 28.3% had children under the age of 18 living with them, 47.2% were married couples living together, 11.7% had a female householder with no husband present, and 39.2% were non-families. 34.4% of all households were made up of individuals, and 20.5% had someone living alone who was 65 years of age or older. The average household size was 2.27 and the average family size was 2.93.

In the city, the population was spread out, with 23.2% under the age of 18, 6.1% from 18 to 24, 29.6% from 25 to 44, 18.1% from 45 to 64, and 23.0% who were 65 years of age or older. The median age was 39 years. For every 100 females, there were 91.7 males. For every 100 females age 18 and over, there were 90.7 males.

As of 2000 the median income for a household in the city was $28,947, and the median income for a family was $37,986. Males had a median income of $27,639 versus $19,167 for females. The per capita income for the city was $15,166. About 8.8% of families and 11.6% of the population were below the poverty line, including 15.0% of those under age 18 and 8.6% of those age 65 or over.

Government

City
The Cottonwood Falls government consists of a mayor and five council members; the council meets the first and third Monday of each month at 7:00 p.m. City Council Members are elected in odd-numbered years and serve four-year terms.
 City Hall, 220 Broadway St.

County
 Chase County Courthouse, Broadway St.
 Chase County Sheriff Department, 201 Walnut St.
 Chase County Fire Department, 201 Walnut.

U.S.
 U.S. Post Office, 206 Broadway St.
 U.S. Consolidated Farm Service Agency, 219 Broadway St.
 National Park Service (U.S. Dept of Interior), 226 Broadway St.

Education

Primary and Secondary Education
The community is served by Chase County USD 284 public school district.  It has two schools.
 Chase County Junior/Senior High School, 600 Main St.
 Chase County Elementary School,  410 Palmer St., Strong City, Kansas.  The former elementary school building in Cottonwood Falls closed in 2018 and is now located in neighboring Strong City.

The Chase County High School mascot is Chase County Bulldogs.

The former Cottonwood Falls High School mascot was Cottonwood Falls Wildcats.

Library
 Burnley Memorial Library, 401 Oak St.

Infrastructure

Transportation
K-177 highway passes north–south through the city.  
Chase County Airport, FAA:9K0, located south-east of 8th St and Airport Rd.

Utilities
 Internet
 Satellite Internet is provided by HughesNet, StarBand, WildBlue.
 TV
 Satellite TV is provided by DirecTV, Dish Network.
 Free over-the-air ATSC digital TV.

Gallery
 Historic Images of Cottonwood Falls, Special Photo Collections at Wichita State University Library.

Notable people
 Dudley Doolittle (1881-1957), U.S. Representative from Kansas, lawyer, banker.
 Harley Martin (1880-1951), Wisconsin state legislator and farmer
 William Morgan (1866-1932), newspaper publisher and editor, author, lieutenant governor of Kansas 1915-19
 Samuel Wood (December 30, 1825 – June 23, 1891), was an American attorney and Kansas politician.

Fiction
In Disney's 1985 film Return to Oz, Doctor J.B. Worley's Clinic is set in Chase County near Cottonwood Falls.

In the 2005 film Jarhead, PFC Fergus O'Donnell is from Cottonwood Falls.

See also
 Strong City, Kansas, approximately 0.5 mile north of Cottonwood Falls
 Chase County Junior/Senior High School
 National Register of Historic Places listings in Chase County, Kansas
 Chase County Courthouse
 Cottonwood River and Great Flood of 1951

References

Further reading

External links

 City of Cottonwood Falls
 Cottonwood Falls - Directory of Public Officials
 Chase County Chamber of Commerce
 Rockne Memorial, Knute Rockne crash site.
 Poster from Chase County Agricultural Fair from October 7-9, 1891
 Grand Central Hotel
 Cottonwood Falls city map, KDOT
 Topo Map of Cottonwood Falls / Bazaar area, USGS

Cities in Kansas
County seats in Kansas
Cities in Chase County, Kansas
Emporia, Kansas micropolitan area
1859 establishments in Kansas Territory